Sobrecastiellu is one of ten parishes (administrative divisions) in Caso, a municipality within the province and autonomous community of Asturias, in northern Spain.

The postal code is 33996.

Villages and hamlets
Sobrecastiellu, which in asturian means uppercastle, is composed by the following villages and hamlets:
Belerda
Bezanes
La Foz 
Pendones
Sotu

The day of the Parroquia is celebrated the 6th of august in the village of Bezanes. It is a hard party where alcohol, drugs and emotions flow freely across the mountains. There have been no mortal casualties during the celebrations for the last 23 years (2017). Some of the most legendary bands that have performed there are Juan Luis and su acordeón or Fervinchu de Cáñamo.

Parishes in Caso